Marta Teresa Smith de Vasconcellos Suplicy (born 18 March 1945) is a Brazilian politician and psychologist. She was Mayor of São Paulo from 2001 to 2004. She later served as the Brazilian Minister of Tourism between 14 March 2007, and 4 June 2008, when she resigned to run again for the mayoralty of São Paulo. In 2015, she left the Brazilian Workers' Party (PT). Suplicy is currently a member of Solidariedade (SD).

Career
Marta Suplicy attended Michigan State University (1966–68), and Pontifícia Universidade Católica de São Paulo (1969–75); she did graduate work at Stanford University (1973). Suplicy started her career as a TV anchorwoman, providing sex advice on a popular show named TV Mulher (Woman TV), broadcast by Rede Globo.  While serving as Congresswoman, she proposed a gay civil unions act.  After running for governor of São Paulo and losing to Mário Covas of the Brazilian Social Democracy Party (PSDB) in 1998, she was elected mayor of the state capital, São Paulo, in 2000.

Her administration of the city is marked by the changes she made to the city's bus system, creating a ticket that is valid for a period of two hours, called bilhete único. In the public educational system she created large schools and cultural centers, called "CEU", which were built in the poorest districts of the city. Towards the end of her administration, she began the construction of several underpasses which alleviated traffic in certain points of the city. She also increased many existing municipal taxes as well as creating new ones. In 2004, she ran for a second term, but was unseated by former PSDB presidential candidate José Serra.

On 14 March 2007, Suplicy accepted the Luiz Inácio Lula da Silva's invitation to become the new Minister of Tourism. Later that same year, on 13 June 2007, when interviewed about the 2006–2007 Brazilian aviation crisis, Suplicy suggested that users of the Congonhas Airport in São Paulo who suffered long delays while heading for vacation should "relax and enjoy because they will forget the troubles afterwards" (Portuguese: "relaxa e goza porque você vai esquecer dos transtornos."). Her speech included a double entendre, as the word she used for "enjoy" can also refer to an orgasm.

On 3 October 2010, Suplicy was elected for the Federal Senate of Brazil, becoming the top voted female Senator ever, receiving over 8.2 million votes. She is also the first female ever elected Senator from São Paulo, the most populous state of Brazil. She promised to fight for the approval of PLC 122, a bill criminalizing homophobia, and also reintroduced the same-sex civil unions bill. The latter received its first victory in the Senate Human Rights Committee on 24 May 2012.

In 2016, after leaving the PT and joining the PMDB, Suplicy vigorously supported Vice President Michel Temer and President of Congress Eduardo Cunha in the move to impeach her former political party colleague President Dilma Rousseff. Suplicy's decision was deemed seriously divisive by many including her son, Supla, who proclaimed,"Minha mãe é golpista, meu pai é petista e eu sou anarquista. Momentos políticos difíceis, né" (My mother is a coup-plotter, my father is a member of the PT, and I am an anarchist. Difficult times, huh?).

Family
Suplicy has three sons, one of whom is the musician Supla. From 1965 to 2001, she was married to Eduardo Suplicy, a PT Brazilian senator from the state of São Paulo who is the father of her children. Later, she married Luis Favre, whom she divorced after a relationship of nearly eight years. She currently dates Márcio Toledo, ex-president of the Jockey Club of São Paulo.

References

|-

|-

|-

|-

|-

1945 births
Living people
Mayors of São Paulo
Members of the Chamber of Deputies (Brazil) from São Paulo
Ministers of Culture of Brazil
Ministers of Tourism of Brazil
Writers from São Paulo
Brazilian people of Portuguese descent
Brazilian people of Italian descent
Brazilian people of English descent
Stanford University alumni
Michigan State University alumni
Women mayors of places in Brazil
Workers' Party (Brazil) politicians
Brazilian Democratic Movement politicians
Brazilian columnists
Brazilian feminists
Women government ministers of Brazil
Brazilian women columnists